The Woman from Till 12 (German: Das Fräulein von Kasse 12) is a 1928 German silent comedy film directed by Erich Schönfelder and starring Werner Fuetterer and Dina Gralla. Much of the film's action takes place in a department store. It was shot at the Johannisthal Studios in Berlin. The film's sets were designed by Kurt Richter. It was released as part of the Parufamet agreement between UFA and the major Hollywood companies.

Cast
In alphabetical order
Henry Bender
Ruth Feiner
Werner Fuetterer as Freddie Werder - Young Man
Dina Gralla as Grete Schober - Cashier
Fritz Hirsch
Erich Kaiser-Titz
Margarete Lanner
Leopold von Ledebur
Emmy Wyda

References

External links

Films of the Weimar Republic
German silent feature films
Films directed by Erich Schönfelder
UFA GmbH films
German black-and-white films
Films shot at Johannisthal Studios
1928 comedy films
German comedy films
Films set in department stores
1920s German films